Christopher Jackson Parry (born 31 July 1934) is a former English cricketer.  Parry was a right-handed batsman who bowled right-arm off break.  He was born in Barnet, Hertfordshire.

Parry made his debut for Buckinghamshire in the 1968 Minor Counties Championship against Berkshire.  Parry played Minor counties cricket for Buckinghamshire from 1968 to 1977, which included 72 Minor Counties Championship matches. In 1970, he made his List A debut against Bedfordshire in the Gillette Cup.  He played 3 further List A matches for Buckinghamshire, the last coming against Glamorgan in the 1972 Gillette Cup. In his 4 List A matches, he scored 10 runs at a batting average of 5.00, with a high score of 10. With the ball he took 4 wickets at a bowling average of 21.75, with best figures of 3/61.

References

External links
Christopher Parry at ESPNcricinfo
Christopher Parry at CricketArchive

1934 births
Living people
People from Chipping Barnet
Cricketers from Hertfordshire
English cricketers
Buckinghamshire cricketers
Buckinghamshire cricket captains